Jose Emilio Esteban is a Mexican-American food scientist and former veterinarian who is serving as under secretary of agriculture for food safety in the Biden administration since January 2023.

Education 
Esteban earned a Doctor of Veterinary Medicine from the National Autonomous University of Mexico. He later earned a Master of Business Administration, Master of Science in preventive veterinary medicine, and PhD in epidemiology from the University of California, Davis.

Career 
Esteban began his career as a veterinarian in Mexico. After graduating from University of California, Davis, he joined the Centers for Disease Control and Prevention, serving as a staff epidemiologist, officer with the Epidemic Intelligence Service, and assistant director of the Food Safety Office. He joined the Food Safety and Inspection Service in 2006 and has served as a science advisor, laboratory director, and chief scientist in the department. He is also chair of the Codex Alimentarius Commission Committee on Food Hygiene and vice president of the International Association for Food Protection.

References 

Living people
Food scientists
University of California, Davis alumni
Centers for Disease Control and Prevention people
United States Department of Agriculture officials
National Autonomous University of Mexico alumni
Mexican veterinarians
Year of birth missing (living people)
Biden administration personnel